Aspelintoppen is the highest mountain of Nathorst Land at Spitsbergen, in the Norwegian archipelago of Svalbard. The mountain has a height of 1,221 m.a.s.l. and is located within Fagerstafjella, to the north of Nobeltoppen. It is named after Swedish industrialist Christian Henrik Thomas Aspelin.

References

Mountains of Spitsbergen